David Meyers may refer to:

Dave Meyers (director) (born 1972), American music video director
Dave Meyers (basketball) (1953–2015), American basketball player

See also
 David Myers (disambiguation)
David Meyer (disambiguation)